Cetema is a genus of fly in the family Chloropidae.

References

Europe
Nearctic

Chloropinae
Chloropidae genera